Peter Richardson may refer to:

Peter Richardson (American director), American documentary filmmaker
Peter Richardson (engineer) (born 1935), British biomedical engineer and academic
Peter Richardson (British director) (born 1951), British actor, comedian, director and screenwriter
Peter Richardson (cricketer) (1931–2017), British cricketer
Peter Richardson (politician) (born 1939), former member of the Australian House of Representatives
Peter Richardson (boxer) (born 1970), British boxer, competed at the 1992 Olympics